Marvin Perkins is an American Latter-day Saint record and video producer.  As an African-American he has sought to change the perceptions of Latter-day Saints towards African-Americans,  and African-Americans towards Latter-day Saints.  Along with Darius Gray, Perkins has produced a set of DVDs titled Blacks in the Scriptures.  He also has written a paper titled "How to Reach African-Americans".

In June 2008, CNN aired an interview with Perkins, in which he was able to vocally explain his faith in the teachings of the Church of Jesus Christ of Latter-day Saints (LDS Church).

Perkins was raised in other Christian faiths and joined the LDS Church in his late teenage years.

Perkins has made CDs of hymns.

Perkins is involved with public affairs for the LDS Church's Genesis Group, a social organization for black Latter-day Saints.

See also
Blacks and The Church of Jesus Christ of Latter-day Saints

References

External links
Perkins's article on sharing the gospel with African-Americans
June 22, 2008 article from Mormon Times on Perkins
listing about Perkins' CDs

1963 births
African-American Latter Day Saints
African-American record producers
Converts to Mormonism
Latter Day Saints from Utah
Living people
Mormonism and race
 
21st-century African-American people
20th-century African-American people